Pro tempore, abbreviated pro tem or p.t., is a Latin phrase which best translates to "for the time being" in English.  This phrase is often used to describe a person who acts as a locum tenens (placeholder) in the absence of a superior, such as the president pro tempore of the United States Senate, who acts in place of the president of the United States Senate—a position that is held ex officio by the current vice president of the United States. Legislative bodies can have one or more pro tempore for the presiding officer.  These positions ostensibly go to legislators experienced in floor debate who are familiar with the content and application of relevant rules and precedents and who have a reputation for fairness among their colleagues. The phrase is also used to describe officers appointed on a temporary basis, prior to the formalisation of their appointments.

Mayor pro tem

A common use of pro tempore in the United States is in municipalities such as cities and towns with regard to the position of the mayor. In many cities, the city council appoints one of its members to act as mayor pro tempore (pro tem) (or vice mayor) in the absence of the actual mayor.

Judge pro tem
In judicial courts, attorneys that volunteer in proceedings are called "judge pro tem".

Dean pro tem
Universities sometimes appoint heads of faculties temporarily until ratified by a board of governors or senate committee. These positions are titled "Dean pro tem".

See also
Ex tempore

References

Latin legal terminology